Martin Kiptolo Lel (born 29 October 1978) is a Kenyan professional long distance and marathon runner.  He won the London Marathon in 2005, 2007, and 2008, the New York City Marathon in 2003 and 2007 and the Great North Run in 2007 and 2009. His personal best time, is 2:05:15, which he ran in the 2008 London Marathon setting a course record. Lel is coached by Claudio Berardelli and lives in the Rift Valley region of Kenya.

Lel ran his first marathons in 2002: he failed to finish at the Prague Marathon, but in his first finish he managed to claim second in the Venice Marathon. He won Lisbon Half Marathon in 2003, 2006 and 2009, was the gold medalist at the 2003 IAAF World Half Marathon Championships, and won the Portugal Half Marathon in 2005. He made his Olympic debut for Kenya at the 2008 Beijing Olympics and came fifth in the marathon.

He beat Samuel Wanjiru to win the inaugural edition of the Rock ‘n’ Roll Mardi Gras Marathon in 2010. In August 2010 he ran at the Falmouth Road Race and took third place. After almost 3 years without running a marathon, he participated in the 2011 London Marathon as a replacement for Samuel Wanjiru, who was originally invited to run, but he still placed second with a time of 2:05:45, out-sprinting Patrick Makau at the finish line. He ran the 15K Saint Silvester Road Race at the end of the year, but was beaten into fourth place. Lel entered two races the year after: he was runner-up again at the 2012 London Marathon (finishing in 2:06:51) and was victorious at the Portugal Half Marathon with a time of 61:28 minutes.

In 2011 the American Charity, Shoe4Africa, funded and opened the Shoe4Africa Martin Lel school in Lel's home village, Kimn'geru, to honor the athlete.

His brother, Cyprian Kimurgor Kotut, followed in his footsteps as a marathon runner and won the 2016 Paris Marathon.

Competition record

International competitions

Road races

References

External links 

Marathoninfo profile
"Martin Lel", n°37 on Time’s list of "100 Olympic Athletes To Watch"

1978 births
Living people
People from Nandi County
Kenyan male long-distance runners
Kenyan male marathon runners
Olympic athletes of Kenya
Athletes (track and field) at the 2008 Summer Olympics
World Athletics Half Marathon Championships winners
London Marathon male winners
New York City Marathon male winners